This is a list of the Fall 1968 PGA Tour Qualifying School graduates. 

The tournament was played over 144 holes at the PGA National Golf Club in Palm Beach Gardens, Florida in early October. There were 79 players in the field and 30 earned their tour card. Grier Jones was the medallist.

Sources:

References

1968 2
1968 PGA Tour Qualifying School graduates 2
PGA Tour Qualifying School Graduates
PGA Tour Qualifying School Graduates